Marius Paul Antoche (born 21 June 1992), is a Romanian professional footballer who plays as a midfielder for Liga I side FC Hermannstadt. Antoche grew up in the academy of Sportul Studențesc București, then in the first part of his career played for various teams, such as: CS Otopeni, CS Balotești or Unirea Tărlungeni. Antoche moved to Petrolul Ploiești in the summer of 2017 and achieved the promotion to Liga II, then in 2019 moved again, this time at Farul Constanța.

Honours
Petrolul Ploiești
Liga III: 2017–18

References

External links
 
 
 

1992 births
People from Suceava County
Living people
Romanian footballers
Association football midfielders
Liga I players
Liga II players
Liga III players
CS Otopeni players
CS Balotești players
CS Unirea Tărlungeni players
FC Petrolul Ploiești players
FCV Farul Constanța players
FC Hermannstadt players